The Province of Lleida (Aranese Occitan: Lhèida ) is one of the four provinces of Catalonia. It lies in north-eastern Spain, in the western part of the autonomous community of Catalonia, and is bordered by the Provinces of Girona, Barcelona, Tarragona, Zaragoza and Huesca and the countries of France and Andorra. It is often popularly referred to as Ponent (i.e. the West).

Of the population of 414,015 (2007), about 30% live in the capital, Lleida. Some other towns in the Province of Lleida are La Seu d'Urgell (see the archbishop, who is also the co-prince to Andorra), Mollerussa, Cervera, Tàrrega, and Balaguer. There are 231 municipalities in Lleida. (See List of municipalities in Lleida.)

Located in the Pyrenees, the Aran Valley is a special comarca with greater autonomy and with Aranese, a variety of Occitan, as its official language.

The Aigüestortes i Estany de Sant Maurici National Park is located in this province.

The province enjoys a thriving fruit-growing industry, including pears and peaches.

According to the 2006 Statute of Autonomy of Catalonia, the provinces of Catalonia are due to be superseded by territorial units (unitats territorials) or vegueries based on a more historical political division, and the Province of Lleida would become two territorial units: Ponent or Terres de Lleida Vegueria (the entire southern area) and Alt Pirineu i Aran Vegueria (the entire northern part plus the comarca of Cerdanya, part of which is currently in the Province of Girona), the county of Solsona going to the Comarques Centrals (Central Counties) Vegueria. The plan is currently on hold as of 2015.

Language 

The Province of Lleida has a characteristic Catalan dialect popularly known as lleidatà, with lo/los used as the masculine definite article instead of el/els as well as its pronunciation in a large number of words. One example of the pronunciation is the a at the end of the word that is pronounced like an e. The local dialect, properly known as North-Western Catalan, is part of the Western Catalan block, and as such, shares some features with Valencian (whose dialects are also part of that group).

Lleida is the only province in Catalonia to have a second native language: Occitan, in the Aran Valley.

Tourism 
Lleida is located in the western part of Catalonia and in the north-west of the Iberian Peninsula, between Barcelona and Madrid, and not far from Zaragoza. It borders France and Andorra to the north. This is a popular destination for mountain activities such as skiing and adventure sports.

Nature 
Lleida has a wide variety of landscapes. This includes the mountain area of the Pyrenees. The Aigüestortes i Estany de Sant Maurici National Park, the only National Park in Catalonia, and the Alt Pirineu (High Pyrenees) and Cadí-Moixeró natural parks are all in the Pyrenees region. The Collegats-Terradets Territorial Park, the Boumort Natural Hunting Reserve and the Congost de Mont-rebei gorge are in the Pre-Pyrenees.

In contrast, the Lleida Plain has more peaceful landscapes. In some cases, these are rather sober, while in others there is fertile land with century-old olive trees, fruit trees, meadows and crop fields. In this area, it is particularly relevant to highlight such spectacular settings as the Estany d'Ivars i Vila-sana pool and the Aiguabarreig (confluence) of the rivers Segre, Cinca and Ebro.

Sports 
The comarques (local districts) of Lleida are also market leaders within Spain in the provision of adventure sports, with more than 170 companies organising around fifty different activities on land and water and in the air. This area is also Spain's leading ski destination.

Their 81 ski lifts have the capacity to carry 115,000 skiers per hour, while the area immediately surrounding these winter sports complexes can also accommodate more than 30,000 visitors.

Culture 
Lleida has a rich architectural heritage. The churches of the Vall de Boi have been declared part of a UNESCO World Heritage Site. Recently Lleida has started many new initiatives for tourists. These include: the Centre d'Observació de l'Univers (Centre for Observing the Universe), or PAM, of Montsec, which is an ambitious project that combines research, education and diffusion within the field of cultural and scientific tourism; the establishment of the Tren dels Llacs (Lakes Train), a touristic railway that connects the provincial capital to the Pre-Pyrenees; the creation of new exhibition spaces (including the Museum of Lleida, the Paper Dresses Museum of Mollerussa and the Skiing Museum of the Val d'Aran); the organisation of routes to help discover the natural, cultural and monumental treasures of Lleida (with the Castles of Sió Route, the Pyrenean Counties and Nostalgic Pallars Route, the Wine Route of Les Garrigues, and the Literary Routes of Pallars, etc.); and also projects to promote excellence in the field of tourism, such as the Network of Villages with Charm.

The city of Lleida 

Lleida, the capital of the province, is notable for its historical-architectural legacy, which includes buildings such as the Seu Vella (old cathedral) and the Knights Templar Castle of Gardeny. These buildings coexist with modern constructions such as La Llotja, a congress and conference centre. Other city landmarks include the diocese and county museum (which has a collection of Roman, Islamic, Romanesque, Gothic, Renaissance and Baroque artefacts and paintings), the Jaume Morera Museum of Modern Art, and the "Roda Roda" Automobile Museum.

Population development
The historical population is given in the following chart:

Notes and references

See also

External links 

Patronat de Turisme
Diputació de Lleida
Xanascat the National Network of Youth Hostels of Catalonia